The Banovina of Serbia or Banate of Serbia, officially known as "the Serbian Lands", was a proposed administrative unit of the Kingdom of Yugoslavia. Its creation was proposed after the establishment of the Banovina of Croatia in 1939. However, due to the Axis occupation and partition of Yugoslavia in 1941 (see World War II in Yugoslavia), the proposal was never implemented.

Proposal
The creation of the Banovina of Croatia in 1939–40 had been negotiated between Prime Minister Dragiša Cvetković and Croatian leader Vladko Maček (of the HSS) in March–August 1939, and settled through an agreement on 26 August. Croatia now became the only banovina constituted on the principle of nationality, named after the majority people (with only a minority left outside it), and thus was close to a nation state. The agreement had little support among Serbian political parties, and the Serbian Orthodox Church and Yugoslav Army opposed it. Relations between Croatian and Serbian politicians (and Croats and Serbs) strained. Its creation opened the question of the political status of the Serb people ("the Serbian question") in the Kingdom of Yugoslavia, with some Serb intellectuals (notably the members of the Serbian Cultural Club) and politicians (including some members of the Yugoslav government, such as Dragiša Cvetković) proposed and planned the creation of the Serbian Banovina, which would include the territory of the existing banovinas of Vrbas, Drina, Danube, Morava, Zeta and Vardar. The Banovina of Croatia included a notable Serb population, while the Serbian Banovina would have similarly included a considerable non-Serb and non-Slavic population. The plans were affirmed in the February 1940 number of Glas, a Serb-centric periodical, published by Matica srpska.  It was stated that apart from the Banovina of Croatia, only the Serbian Banovina and theoretical Banovina of Slovenia had the precedent and right to form and exist, as states of three ethnic groups which formed Yugoslavia, i.e. State of Slovenes, Croats and Serbs and Kingdom of Serbs, Croats and Slovenes. The process of its organization was supposed to be similar to that of Croatia.

Demographics
According to 1931 Yugoslav census, the existing banovinas that, according to the proposal, would be included into the Banovina of Serbia had the following population:
 Vrbas Banovina: 1,037,382, of which 600,529 (58%) Orthodox Christians
 Drina Banovina: 1,534,739, of which 992,924 (65%) Orthodox Christians
 Danube Banovina: 2,387,295, of which 1,393,269 (58%) Orthodox Christians
 Morava Banovina: 1,435,584, of which 1,364,490 (95%) Orthodox Christians
 Zeta Banovina: 925,516, of which 516,490 (56%) Orthodox Christians
 Vardar Banovina: 1,574,243, of which 1,046,039 (66%) Orthodox Christians

See also
 Ethnic groups in Yugoslavia
 History of modern Serbia

References

Sources
 
 
 
 
 

Kingdom of Yugoslavia
Yugoslav Serbia
20th century in Vojvodina
History of Kosovo
20th century in Montenegro
Yugoslav Bosnia and Herzegovina
History of Republika Srpska
Yugoslav Macedonia
Yugoslavia
History of the Serbs